Primula chasmophila is a species of flowering plant in the Primulaceae family. It is endemic to Bhutan.

References

Endemic flora of Bhutan
Flora of Bhutan
chasmophila
Taxa named by Isaac Bayley Balfour
Taxa named by John Hutchinson (botanist)